Watkin's Tower was a partially completed iron lattice tower in Wembley Park, London, England (then in Middlesex). Its construction was an ambitious project to create a -high visitor attraction in Wembley Park to the north of the city, led by the railway entrepreneur Sir Edward Watkin. Marketed as the "Great Tower of London", it was designed to surpass the height of the Eiffel Tower in Paris, and it was part of Wembley Park's emergence as a recreational place. The tower was never completed and it was demolished in 1907. The site of the tower is now occupied by the English national football ground, Wembley Stadium.

Names 
Numerous names and nicknames were given to the tower during its planning, construction and legacy.  These include Watkin's Tower, Watkin's Folly, the Wembley Park Tower, the Wembley Tower, the Metropolitan Tower, and the London Stump.

History 

Sir Edward Watkin (1819–1901) was a British Member of Parliament and railway entrepreneur, noted for being chairman of nine different British railway companies. He was an ambitious visionary, and presided over large-scale railway engineering projects to fulfil his business aspirations. He began work on the construction of a channel tunnel under the English Channel, with the aim of connecting his lines to the railway network in France, and successfully opened the Great Central Main Line. Although his channel tunnel project failed in 1881, Watkin remained a driven innovator, inspired by grand schemes which could augment his railway empire.

Among his numerous railway executive appointments, Watkin was chairman of the Metropolitan Railway (MR), an expanding London transport company which was later to become the Metropolitan line of the present-day London Underground system. Watkin was keen to attract more passengers onto his trains and was aggressively extending his railway into Buckinghamshire. He also considered transporting Londoners out into the countryside as a business opportunity and needed a major attraction to lure the crowds out of the city and onto his trains. To this end, Watkin purchased a tract of land near a rural Middlesex hamlet called Wembley, adjacent to the route of the Metropolitan Railway, with the goal of building an amusement park laid out with boating lakes, a waterfall, ornamental gardens (the park land had previously been landscaped  by Humphry Repton and known as Wembley Park) in the 18th century), and cricket and football pitches. The crowning glory of Watkin's amusement park was to be a soaring metal tower which would be centrepiece of the pleasure park and would offer panoramic views of the surrounding countryside, just 12 minutes from Baker Street station.

The paying public was to gain access to Wembley Park and its tower by train, arriving at the new Wembley Park station which the Metropolitan Railway constructed specially for the attraction, incorporating additional platforms to handle the large crowds which Watkin confidently anticipated would flock to the park. The station opened in 1893–4.

Design and construction 

Inspired by the construction of the Eiffel Tower in Paris, France, Watkin invited Gustave Eiffel himself to design the tower, but the Frenchman declined – replying that if he designed the tower, the French people "would not think me so good a Frenchman as I hope I am."

An architectural design competition was held in 1890, and a total of 68 designs were submitted. Some of the more exotic proposals included a £1m tower inspired by the Leaning Tower of Pisa; a structure with "a captive parachute to hold four persons"; and a tower with a spiral railway climbing its exterior. One design included a 1/12-scale model of the Great Pyramid of Giza, envisioned as a "colony of aerial vegetarians, who would grow their own food in hanging gardens".

The winning entry, number 37, was submitted by Stewart, MacLaren and Dunn of London. It was to have two observation decks – each with restaurants, theatres, dancing rooms and exhibitions – winter gardens, Turkish baths and  a 90-bedroom hotel. The top of the tower, reached by a system of lifts, was to provide a fresh-air sanatorium and an astronomical observatory, taking advantage of the clearer air offered by the altitude. The entire structure was to be illuminated by electric light.

Watkin formed a company to manage the project, the International Tower Construction Company and to oversee construction he appointed Benjamin Baker, a civil engineer who was involved in the design of the Forth Bridge and the Aswan Dam. After an unsuccessful appeal for public subscription, the company could only proceed with the project with its own funds; Watkin commissioned a redesign and the octagonal design was scaled back to a cheaper, four-legged design that bore much more resemblance to the Eiffel Tower. The foundations were laid in 1892 and construction work commenced in June 1893. At the same time, the surrounding park began to be laid out with a cricket pitch and a boating lake, in readiness for the first visitors.

Opening and demolition 

Wembley Park officially opened to the public in May 1894, although construction of the tower was still underway and the first stage had not yet been completed. Nevertheless, the park attracted 12,000 visitors during 1895 and was proving to be a popular attraction for Londoners. At this time, work was behind schedule as Watkin retired through ill health. It was soon discovered that the structure's foundations were unsteady — the reduction in the number of the tower's legs, carried out to reduce costs, had resulted in increased pressure on each leg and this was causing subsidence.

Over the next few years, the construction company experienced problems financing the project and went into voluntary liquidation in 1899. Work stopped, and the tower was never completed.  Watkin died in 1901, and with halted construction, the "unsafe" site was closed to the public the following year. Between 1904 and 1907, the completed section of the tower was demolished using dynamite.

Despite the failure and destruction of Watkin's star attraction, Wembley Park continued to flourish as a popular recreation venue, offering football, cricket, cycling, rowing, athletics and, in winter, ice skating on the frozen lake. By the end of World War I, over a hundred sports clubs used the Wembley facilities. In order to recoup its losses, the tower construction company turned to house building and was re-incorporated as the Wembley Park Estate Company in 1906, laying out the Wembley suburb with exclusive homes and a golf course.

After the war, Wembley was selected as the site for the 1924 British Empire Exhibition and the park land was purchased from the Metropolitan Railway company. Among the pavilions and halls designed for the exhibition by John William Simpson, Maxwell Ayrton and Owen Williams was a grand sports arena, the 125,000-capacity British Empire Exhibition Stadium, later to be known as Wembley Stadium. It was built on the site of Watkin's Tower, covering its foundations, and opened in 1923. It later became the home ground of the England national football team. When the original stadium was rebuilt in 2000–2003, the lowering of the level of the pitch resulted in the concrete foundations of the tower being rediscovered on the stadium site underneath the Twin Towers.

Legacy 

Watkin's Folly was not the last attempt to build a notable British tower. In the north west of England, the Blackpool Tower (1894), New Brighton Tower (1896) and Morecambe Tower (1898) were also built, although only the Blackpool Tower remains standing.

Although Watkin's tower has gone, Wembley Park continues to attract large crowds to sporting and musical events at Wembley Stadium, and it served as a venue for both the 1948 and 2012 Summer Olympics. The station built by the Metropolitan Railway remains in service to this day, providing a major transport link for Wembley crowds via the London Underground Metropolitan and Jubilee lines.

The story of Watkin's Tower was recounted briefly in the 1973 BBC documentary by the then Poet Laureate, Sir John Betjeman, Metro-land. In the programme, Betjeman described Watkin's vision of creating an engineering wonder in a little-known rural area north of London:

The programme also showed some of the unsuccessful designs for the tower. The script for Metro-land can be found in Betjeman's England, a collection of writings by John Betjeman published in 2009.

The history of Watkin's Tower is also showcased in the Brent Museum located in Willesden Green Library. The museum formerly allowed visitors to build a tower before it comes tumblings down through a vibrating floor, however, this has been removed since the renovation of the library in 2015.

References
Information taken from London as it Might Have Been by Felix Barker and Ralph Hyde, 1982,

External links

SkyscraperPage - Watkin's Tower (358 m), a conception of the illustrator.
SkyscraperPage - Watkin's Tower (47 m)
Skyscraper News - Wembley Park Tower
The 68 designs submitted to the contest Great Tower for London 1890

Folly towers in England
Former buildings and structures in the London Borough of Brent
Towers in London
Demolished buildings and structures in London
Wembley
Towers completed in 1894
19th-century architecture in the United Kingdom
Buildings and structures demolished in 1907
History of Middlesex